Drain is a city in Douglas County, Oregon, United States. The population was 1,151 at the 2010 census. Drain is named after town founder and politician Charles J. Drain, who donated  of nearby land to the Oregon and California Railroad in 1871.

History
In 1876, a coach road was established between Drain and Scottsburg. Drain was the starting point for the Drain-Coos Bay stage line, which ran to Scottsburg and then by river steamer to Gardiner and the beach on the south side of the mouth of the Umpqua River.

The Drain Normal School was founded in the community in 1883 by the Methodist Church. The state took over the school in 1885 and named it as the Central Oregon State Normal School, before it closed in June 1908.

Geography and climate

Drain is at the crossroads of Oregon Route 99 and Oregon Route 38, at a pass in the Coast Range, on the way west to the Pacific Ocean.

Elk Creek and Pass Creek, both tributaries of the Umpqua River, converge in Drain.

Pass Creek Bridge, a covered bridge in a park behind the Drain Civic Center, was formerly a road bridge. In 1987, the city moved the structure to the park and opened it to pedestrian traffic only. In 2014, the city completely closed the bridge, made unsafe by rotting support timbers.

Drain, like most of western Oregon, has a Mediterranean climate (Köppen Csb) with dry summers featuring cool mornings and hot afternoons, and chilly, if not severe, wet winters. The most precipitation in a single day has been  on January 18, 1951.

During the summer months, days are usually hot and clear, whilst nights are cool: in the summer of 2003 only  of rain fell over the three months, and in 1951 no measurable precipitation occurred for ninety-five days between May 24 and August 26.

Demographics

2010 census
As of the census of 2010, there were 1,151 people, 454 households, and 319 families residing in the city. The racial makeup of the city was 92.9% White, 0.2% African American, 2.7% Native American, 0.3% Asian, 1.0% from other races, and 3.0% from two or more races. Hispanic or Latino of any race were 4.4% of the population.

There were 454 households, of which 33.7% had children under the age of 18 living with them, 50.0% were married couples living together, 13.7% had a female householder with no husband present, 6.6% had a male householder with no wife present, and 29.7% were non-families. 22.9% of all households were made up of individuals, and 9.5% had someone living alone who was 65 years of age or older. The average household size was 2.54 and the average family size was 2.95.

The median age in the city was 39.5 years. 25.4% of residents were under the age of 18; 9.5% were between the ages of 18 and 24; 22.1% were from 25 to 44; 26.6% were from 45 to 64; and 16.4% were 65 years of age or older. The gender makeup of the city was 48.8% male and 51.2% female.

2000 census
As of the census of 2000, there were 1,021 people, 397 households, and 289 families residing in the city. The population density was 1,879.0 people per square mile (730.0/km2). There were 441 housing units at an average density of 811.6 per square mile (315.3/km2). The racial makeup of the city was 90.60% White, 0.10% African American, 2.64% Native American, 0.49% Asian, 0.29% Pacific Islander, 1.57% from other races, and 4.31% from two or more races. Hispanic or Latino of any race were 3.33% of the population.

There were 397 households, out of which 36.5% had children under the age of 18 living with them, 55.7% were married couples living together, 13.4% had a female householder with no husband present, and 27.0% were non-families. 22.9% of all households were made up of individuals, and 9.6% had someone living alone who was 65 years of age or older. The average household size was 2.57 and the average family size was 3.02.

In the city, the population was spread out, with 26.7% under the age of 18, 8.8% from 18 to 24, 27.4% from 25 to 44, 23.8% from 45 to 64, and 13.2% who were 65 years of age or older. The median age was 38 years. For every 100 females, there were 96.3 males. For every 100 females age 18 and over, there were 86.5 males.

The median income for a household in the city was $27,833, and the median income for a family was $34,231. Males had a median income of $30,278 versus $20,063 for females. The per capita income for the city was $13,810. About 8.6% of families and 10.3% of the population were below the poverty line, including 10.3% of those under age 18 and 7.0% of those age 65 or over.

Notable people
 John Hanlin (sheriff)
 Dan Hicks [two-time NCAA Division I National Wrestling Champion for Oregon State University, 1978 and 1979
 Tom Ward KVAL Sportcaster

References

External links 

 Entry for Drain in the Oregon Blue Book
 Historic images of Drain from Salem Public Library

Cities in Oregon
Cities in Douglas County, Oregon
Populated places established in 1887
1887 establishments in Oregon